The 1926 Rutgers Queensmen football team represented Rutgers University as an independent during the 1926 college football season. In their third and final season under head coach John Wallace, the Queensmen compiled a 3–6 record and were outscored by their opponents, 134 to 49.

Schedule

References

Rutgers
Rutgers Scarlet Knights football seasons
Rutgers Queensmen football